Roger Federer was the defending champion and won in the final 4–6, 6–1, 6–2 against Feliciano López.

Seeds
A champion seed is indicated in bold text while text in italics indicates the round in which that seed was eliminated.

  Roger Federer (champion)
  Guillermo Coria (first round)
  Rainer Schüttler (first round)
  David Nalbandian (first round)
  Mark Philippoussis (first round)
  Tim Henman (first round)
  Paradorn Srichaphan (second round)
  Sjeng Schalken (quarterfinals)

Draw

External links
 2004 Dubai Tennis Championships Draw

2004 Dubai Tennis Championships
Singles